Myanmar participated in the 2009 Asian Indoor Games in Hanoi, Vietnam on 30 October – 8 November 2009. Myanmar sent a delegation of 2 competitors in the sport of billiards.

Cue sports

References

Nations at the 2009 Asian Indoor Games
2009 in Burmese sport
Myanmar at the Asian Games